Åke Erik Lassas (21 August 1924 – 16 April 2009) was a Swedish ice hockey player. He competed at the 1952 and 1956 Winter Olympics and finished in third and fourth place, respectively. He played club hockey for Leksands IF and won the inaugural Guldpucken award in 1956 given to the best player in the Swedish league. He also competed in bandy and association football at the national level.

References 

1924 births
2009 deaths
Ice hockey players at the 1952 Winter Olympics
Ice hockey players at the 1956 Winter Olympics
Leksands IF players
Medalists at the 1952 Winter Olympics
Olympic bronze medalists for Sweden
Olympic ice hockey players of Sweden
Olympic medalists in ice hockey
People from Leksand Municipality
Swedish ice hockey players
Sportspeople from Dalarna County